Ammapalem is a village in Konijerla of Khammam district in the state of Telangana, India.

References
Villages in Khammam district